We Can't Be Stopped is the third studio album by Geto Boys, released on July 9, 1991. It was among their most successful records in terms of units sold. The album is analysed track-by-track by Geto Boys in Brian Coleman's book Check the Technique. We Can't Be Stopped was certified Platinum in early 1992.

Recording
We Can't Be Stopped took only a few weeks to record. During the recording of the album, DJ Ready Red, one of the original Geto Boys members, left the group for personal reasons.

In We Can't Be Stopped, each member of the group has three solo tracks. Three tracks have all three members on the rapping roster, including a short verse from DJ Ready Red on the title track.

Album cover
The album cover is a graphic picture of member Bushwick Bill in the hospital. Bill was shot in the eye as he and his girlfriend tussled over a gun. Bushwick Bill wanted her to kill him and during the altercation he was shot as both hands were on the gun. The other two Geto Boys members and the group's management team took Bill out of the hospital room in order to take the picture, removing his eyepatch and intravenous drip in the process. Bill later expressed regret over the album cover, saying, "It still hurts me to look at that cover because that was a personal thing I went through... I still feel the pain from the fact I've got a bullet in my brain... I think it was pretty wrong to do it, even though I went along with the program at first."

Reception

Fred Thomas from AllMusic called the album "[the group's] most visceral work, rising to platinum success against the odds and inspiring innovation in the genre with its powerful and distinctively Southern perspective on what rap could be." James Bernard of Entertainment Weekly gave the album a "B," saying that much of the   “album stings, and their raw honesty has driven it onto the Billboard pop Top 40..."

The track "Mind Playing Tricks on Me" has been singled out for praise. Pitchfork Media ranked the song #45 on its Top 200 Tracks of the 1990s list, with reviewer Tom Breihan writing "This track established the South as a serious force in the music, proving that these Texans could do dark better than anyone on either coast." XXL ranked the song #14 on its list of the 250 Greatest Hip-Hop Songs from 1990 to 1999. The Source gave the track its "Best Song" award in 1991. Robert Christgau gave the album a choice cut rating, only liking "Mind Playing Tricks on Me."

There's a 'Chopped and Screwed' version of the album by DJ Spice.

Track listing

Sample credits
The following samples were used on We Can't Be Stopped:
"Rebel Rap Family"
"Scarface Theme" by Giorgio Moroder

"Homie Don't Play That"
"(Not Just) Knee Deep" by Funkadelic
"More Bounce to the Ounce" by Zapp & Roger
"West Coast Poplock" by Ronnie Hudson
"Atomic Dog" by George Clinton
"Pumpin' It Up" by P-Funk Allstars
"So Ruff, So Tuff" by Roger Troutman

"Mind Playing Tricks on Me"
"Hung Up on My Baby" by Isaac Hayes
"The Jam" by Graham Central Station

"I'm Not a Gentleman"
"I Heard That!!" by Quincy Jones
"You'll Like It Too" by Funkadelic

"Gota Let Your Nuts Hang"
"Corey Died on the Battlefield" by The Wild Magnolias

"Fuck a War"
"Devil With the Bust" by Sound Experience

"Ain't With Being Broke"
"Damn Right I Am Somebody" by Fred Wesley & The J.B.'s

"Quickie"
"Impeach the President" by The Honey Drippers
"Oh Honey" by The Delegation

"Punk-Bitch Game"
"Don't Call Me Nigger, Whitey" by Sly and the Family Stone

"The Other Level"
"God Make Me Funky" by The Headhunters and The Pointer Sisters
"Love Hangover" by Diana Ross
"Kool Is Back" by Funk Inc.

"Trophy"
"Terminator X to the Edge of Panic" by Public Enemy
"Catch a Groove" by Juice
"Soul Makossa" by Manu Dibango
"I Gotcha" by Joe Tex

Charts

Weekly charts

Year-end charts

Singles

Certifications

References

1991 albums
Geto Boys albums
Horrorcore albums
Rap-A-Lot Records albums
G-funk albums